The Minhaj University Lahore (MUL) is a private university located in Lahore, Punjab, Pakistan.

History and overview
Minhaj university was established on 18 September 1986 by Dr. Muhammad Tahir-ul-Qadri as one of the educational branches of the international educational and welfare organisation Minhaj-ul-Quran, which he had founded five years before on 31 October 1981. It has two campuses: one located in Model Town Extension, Lahore and second campus is located in Township, Lahore. The degree-awarding charter was granted to university from Government of the Punjab on 15 October 2005.

Academics
MUL consists of the following faculties and schools:

Faculty of Economics and Management Sciences
School of Business Management
School of Economics
School of Commerce and Finance
International Center of Excellence

Faculty of Basic Sciences and Mathematics
School of Chemistry
School of Physics
School of Mathematics
School of Statistics
School of Botany

Faculty of Computer Science and Information Technology
School of Computer Sciences
School of Information Technology
School of Software Engineering
School of Cyber Security

Faculty of Social Sciences and Humanities
School of Political Studies
School of Mass Communication
School of Education Sciences
School of Library and Information Sciences

Faculty of Languages
School of English Language and Literature
School of Arabic and Oriental Languages
School of Urdu and Asian Languages

Faculty of Islamic Studies
School of Islamic thought and civilization
School of Shariah and Islamic Law

Faculty of Allied Health Sciences
Faculty of clinical nutrition
Food science and technology

See also
Minhaj ul Quran
List of universities in Pakistan

References

External links
MUL official website
Minhajians alumni website

Minhaj-ul-Quran
Universities and colleges in Lahore
Islamic universities and colleges in Pakistan
1986 establishments in Pakistan
Educational institutions established in 1986
Engineering universities and colleges in Pakistan
Private universities and colleges in Punjab, Pakistan